Norton is a civil parish, and Norton and Askern is a ward, in the metropolitan borough of Doncaster, South Yorkshire, England.  The parish and ward contain 27 listed buildings that are recorded in the National Heritage List for England.  Of these, two are listed at Grade I, the highest of the three grades, and the others are at Grade II, the lowest grade.  The parish and ward contain the villages of Norton, Campsall, Skellow, and Sutton and the surrounding countryside.  Most of the listed buildings are houses, cottages and associated structures, farmhouses and farm buildings.  The other listed buildings include a church, three cross bases, two bridges, a former windmill, a former watermill, a public house, two mileposts, a former toll house, and a village pump.


Key

Buildings

References

Citations

Sources

 

Lists of listed buildings in South Yorkshire
Buildings and structures in the Metropolitan Borough of Doncaster